The phrase Little Flower can refer to:

People
Thérèse of Lisieux, (1873 - 1897), a saint of the Roman Catholic Church
Fiorello H. LaGuardia, (1882 - 1947), a mayor of New York

Places
Little Flower, Indianapolis, Indiana, a neighborhood in the United States

Institutions

Religious facilities
Basilica of the National Shrine of the Little Flower in San Antonio, Texas, USA
National Shrine of the Little Flower Basilica in Royal Oak, Michigan, USA
Little Flower Hall, Holy Redeemer Church, Bray, Wicklow, Ireland
Church of the Little Flower (Coral Gables, Florida), USA
Little Flower Church, Kaprassery, India
Little Flower Church,Trivandrum, India
Little Flower Mission, Alice Springs, Australia

Schools
Little Flower School (disambiguation)
Little Flower High School (disambiguation)
Little Flower Academy, Vancouver, B.C., Canada
Little Flower Junior College, Hyderabad, India
Little Flower College, Guruvayoor, Thissur, India

Film
, a 1979 Chinese movie starring Joan Chen
Little Flowers, a 2010 Canadian short film

Other uses
Little Flower Hospital, Agamaly, Kerala, India

See also

 
 
 Flower (disambiguation)
 Little (disambiguation)
 Saint Therese (disambiguation) (including topics related to Saint Therese of Liseux)